Bauhinia ungulata is a shrub species (up to 7 m height) in the tropical Americas, from Mexico to Paraguay. It is commonly found throughout the Brazilian open savannas of Cerrado and Pantanal. Its nocturnal flowers are pollinated by phyllostomid bats, mainly the small Glossophaginae Glossophaga soricina and Anoura caudifer and the Phyllostominae Phyllostomus discolor, which visit the flowers singly or in pairs.

References

ungulata
Flora of South America